The Ericsson R290 is a combined GSM and satellite phone using the Globalstar satellite network. The R290 was introduced in June 1999 and manufactured in the United Kingdom by Ericsson Mobile Communications.

The Globalstar uses a foldable antenna that is the same length as the body of the telephone. The R290 comes in a blue and black case in a style similar to other Ericsson phones of its period. The case incorporates some Gore-Tex weatherproofing, similar to that used in the Ericsson R310s, although less extensive.

The R290 also has a built-in modem for data and fax communication at 9.6 kbit/s in GSM mode and 7.2 kbit/s in satellite mode.

The R290 is somewhat larger than typical, pure GSM phones, measuring  ×  ×  and weighing  (with slim battery). The R290 has relatively brief battery life compared with typical, pure GSM phones of its generation.

Because it uses a non-standard battery voltage, its charging connector is not one of the types commonly seen on other Ericsson handsets. The device was capable of detecting over-voltage from inappropriate charging equipment, and warning the user to disconnect the charger.

The R290 spanned the corporate change from Ericsson to Sony Ericsson (when many of Ericsson's other phones were redesigned), being the only combined GSM and satellite phone in their range; it was not rebranded, however.

Operators
For United Kingdom users, access to the Globalstar network was available when using a Vodafone GSM SIM card. From 2007, the Globalstar network experienced technical problems with its satellites, and the Vodafone arrangement is no longer in place.

References

External links

Ericsson official Site :
 http://www.ericsson.com/thecompany/
 R290 Dual-Mode Satellite Phone data sheet. Archived from the original on 2011-03-04.

R290
Satellite telephony
Ericsson
Mobile phones introduced in 1999